Pierre Smets (born 19 March 1950) is a Belgian judoka. He competed in the men's open category event at the 1972 Summer Olympics.

References

1950 births
Living people
Belgian male judoka
Olympic judoka of Belgium
Judoka at the 1972 Summer Olympics
Place of birth missing (living people)
20th-century Belgian people